Highwater is a 2008 documentary film centered on surfing's Triple Crown competitions, the professional surfing tour's final three competitions held each year on the North Shore of Oahu.  The film is directed by Dana Brown, son of famed surfer and filmmaker Bruce Brown.

Background
Starting on Halloween and ending around Christmas, the competition attracts the sport's best surfers to Oahu's legendary North Shore, known for its huge waves and unparalleled surf. The Vans Triple Crown is the ultimate proving ground for world class surfers, but the event also lures amateur surfers.

Plot
Real life drama, humor, death-defying waves, rivalries, parties, heart-break, romance, injuries, and humanity all collide during the nearly two-month competition on Hawaii's 7 Mile Miracle. The film follows multiple story lines over the course of the entire competition, taking the real-life events to construct a moving story.

Featured surfers
Kelly Slater
Sunny Garcia
Andy Irons
Layne Beachley
Rochelle Ballard
Mark Healy
Pat O'Connell
Rob Machado
John John Florence
Bruce Irons
Chelsea Georgeson
Jesse Billauer
Danny Fuller
Lisa Anderson
Bruce Brown

Release
The film had its debut in August 2008 at the Surfing Heritage Foundation facility in San Clemente, California. The world premiere was held at the Santa Monica Pier on May 22, 2009 in celebrations of the pier's 100th anniversary. Proceeds from the ticket sales went to help restoration of the pier.

References

External links
 
 
 Apostrophe Films
 Surfers Village Review

2008 films
2008 documentary films
Documentary films about surfing
American sports documentary films
Films shot in Hawaii
Films directed by Dana Brown
American surfing films
2000s English-language films
2000s American films
English-language documentary films